Boundary House is a 1918 British silent drama film directed by Cecil M. Hepworth and starring Alma Taylor, Gerald Ames and William Felton.

Plot
A man forces a woman to pose as his dead wife, who was her doppelganger.

Cast
 Alma Taylor as Jenny Gay 
 Gerald Ames as Cherry Ricardo 
 William Felton as Old Fob 
 Victor Prout as Henry Gay  
 John MacAndrews as Ricardo  
 Gwynne Herbert as Miss Gay

References

Bibliography
 Palmer, Scott. British Film Actors' Credits, 1895-1987. McFarland, 1988.

External links

1918 films
1918 drama films
British drama films
British silent feature films
Films directed by Cecil Hepworth
Films based on British novels
Hepworth Pictures films
British black-and-white films
1910s English-language films
1910s British films
Silent drama films
Films about lookalikes
Films based on works by Peggy Webling